Daniel Goens (born 15 September 1948) is a retired Belgian track cyclist who was most successful in the tandem, together with Robert Van Lancker. In this event, they won bronze medals at the 1968 Summer Olympics and 1967 World Championships, and a silver medal at the 1968 World Championships.

References

1948 births
Living people
Belgian male cyclists
Cyclists at the 1968 Summer Olympics
Olympic cyclists of Belgium
Olympic bronze medalists for Belgium
Olympic medalists in cycling
Cyclists from Brussels
Medalists at the 1968 Summer Olympics
20th-century Belgian people